The Honourable Order of Jerusalem (also spelled as the  Honorable Order of Jerusalem) is an ecclesiastical decoration conferred by the World Methodist Council. It is one of the highest distinctions in Methodism. The Honourable Order of Jerusalem was created to “honor individuals whose service to the global Methodist/Wesleyan family has been marked with honor and distinction.”

See also 

Chivalric order
List of ecclesiastical decorations

References 

Ecclesiastical decorations
Methodism